Princess flower is a common name for several plants and may refer to:

Pleroma granulosum (syn. Tibouchina granulosa)
Pleroma semidecandrum (syn. Tibouchina semidecandra)
Pleroma urvilleanum (syn. Tibouchina urvilleana)